Justin Dooley (born 23 October 1970) is an Australian former professional rugby league footballer who played in the 1990s and 2000s.

Background
Dooley was born in Maitland, New South Wales, Australia.

Career
He played for the Eastern Suburbs, Western Suburbs and the Hunter Mariners in Australia. In the Super League he played for the London Broncos.

References

External links
NRL points
London Broncos profile
Broncos tame Wildcats

1970 births
Living people
Australian rugby league players
Hunter Mariners players
London Broncos players
Maitland Pickers players
People educated at St Joseph's College, Hunters Hill
Rugby league players from Maitland, New South Wales
Rugby league props
Rugby league second-rows
Sydney Roosters players
Western Suburbs Magpies players